The Kilombero cisticola (Cisticola bakerorum) is a species of bird in the family Cisticolidae. It is found in Tanzania.

It was first recognised as new by Éric Burnier in the 1980s. He brought this to the attention of Neil and Liz Baker, who soon confirmed the identity of this species as new to science. It was formally described in 2021 and dedicated to the Bakers.

References

Kilombero cisticola
Endemic birds of Tanzania
Kilombero cisticola